Jiagedaqi District or Jagdaqi District (Oroqen: Jagdaqi, meaning "area with Pinus sylvestris var. mongolica Litvin") is a district and the de facto seat of Daxing'anling Prefecture, Northeast China. Its physical location is in Inner Mongolia; however, it is de facto under the jurisdiction of Heilongjiang Province due to no suitable location of seat in Daxing'anling itself. The government of Inner Mongolia disputes this arrangement.

Administrative divisions 
Jiagedaqi District is divided into the following administrative divisions:

 Dongshan Subdistrict
 Weidong Subdistrict
 Hongqi Subdistrict
 Changhong Subdistrict
 Shuguang Subdistrict
 Guangming Subdistrict
 Jiabei Township
 Baihua Township

Climate

Transport
 Jiagedaqi Airport
 China National Highway 111
 Inner Mongolia Provincial Highway 301
 Nenjiang-Greater Khingan Forest (Nenlin) Railway
Jiagedaqi railway station

References

External links
 Official site of Jiagedaqi 

County level divisions of Heilongjiang
Internal territorial disputes